The following lists events that happened during 2014 in the Republic of Albania.

Incumbents
President: Bujar Nishani
Prime Minister: Edi Rama
Deputy Prime Minister: Niko Peleshi

Events

April
 April 11 - Montenegro, Norway, Iceland and Albania join the list of countries supporting sanctions including asset freezings and travel bans directed at Russian individuals due to the 2014 Crimean crisis.

June
 June - The European Commission recommends Albania as a candidate for European Union membership.

September
 September 21 - Pope Francis celebrates Mass in Albania.

October
 October - Albania vs Serbia football match in Belgrade abandoned after brawls over Kosovo.

November
  November - Prime Minister Edi Rama's visit to Belgrade to mend bridges fails after he and Serbian counterpart Aleksandar Vucic row publicly over Kosovo.

See also
 2014 in Albanian television

References

External links

 
Years of the 21st century in Albania
2010s in Albania
Albania
Albania